Darren Fritz (born 13 March 1969) is an Australian former professional rugby league footballer who played in the 1980s and 1990s.

Playing career
A Rockhampton junior, Fritz was a reserve in Canberra's 1991 Grand Final loss to the Penrith Panthers at the Sydney Football Stadium. Fritz played for Wakefield Trinity in the 1992-93 English season. Darren Fritz played right-, i.e. number 12, in Wakefield Trinity's 29-16 victory over Sheffield Eagles in the 1992–93 Yorkshire County Cup Final during the 1992–93 season at Elland Road, Leeds on Sunday 18 October 1992. Fritz joined the Illawarra Steelers in the 1994 season. One of the biggest players in the premiership, he played in all 3 matches for Queensland in the 1994 State of Origin series. Fritz's stint with the Steelers ended at the conclusion of the 1996 season. In 1997, Fritz joined the North Sydney Bears. Chronic back injuries saw him released from his contract with Norths.

Retirement
In 1998, Fritz joined Western Suburbs. He played his final two seasons of rugby league with Wests before announcing his retirement at the end of the 1999 season.

References

1969 births
Living people
Australian rugby league players
Canberra Raiders players
Illawarra Steelers players
North Sydney Bears players
Queensland Rugby League State of Origin players
Rugby league players from Rockhampton, Queensland
Rugby league props
Rugby league second-rows
Wakefield Trinity players
Western Suburbs Magpies players